Lebanon competed at the 1964 Summer Olympics in Tokyo, Japan. Five competitors, all men, took part in three events in two sports.

Fencing

Four fencers represented Lebanon in 1964.

Men's épée
 Hassan El-Said
 Michel Saykali
 Joseph Gemayel

Men's team épée
 Michel Saykali, Joseph Gemayel, Hassan El-Said, Ibrahim Osman

Shooting

 Joseph Aoun

References

External links
Official Olympic Reports

Nations at the 1964 Summer Olympics
1964
1964 in Lebanese sport